(2E,6E)-farnesyl-diphosphate diphosphate-lyase may refer to:
Enzymes